Eric Orlando Godoy Zepeda (born 26 March 1987) is a Chilean former football defender.

Career
Debuted in 2005 at the First Team and was a little like winning a place holder with great performances which led him to be called up to the national team.

Fighting a post holder, together with their colleagues who serve as a central defender but also the DT Jorge Aravena puts it as midfielder, a position that was playing throw the José Sulantay process of  FIFA U-20 World Cup.

National Team
At the time, was pre-selectioned sub 17 (2005). Moreover, in the presence sum Valparaiso team that participated in the Binacionals Goames of 2003.

Besides records attendances in the selection chilena sub 20 in the South American sub-20, 2007 (in the 4-2 victory over Peru as alternate) and friendly matches to prepare for it. He was a key player as the link connecting to the defense and midfield in Chile in 2007 FIFA U-20 World Cup in Canada. He played in 5 of 7 matches during the FIFA U-20 World Cup.

At senior level, he made one appearance in a friendly match against Paraguay in 2011.

Personal life
After his retirement, he and his family moved to Montreal, Canada, since his wife is Chilean-Canadian.

Honours
2007 South American Youth Championship:
Fourth place: 2007
FIFA U-20 World Cup:
Third place: 2007

References

External links

1987 births
Living people
Sportspeople from Valparaíso
Chilean footballers
Chile under-20 international footballers
Chile international footballers
Chilean Primera División players
Primera B de Chile players
Santiago Wanderers footballers
San Marcos de Arica footballers
Deportes La Serena footballers
Curicó Unido footballers
Cobresal footballers
Universidad de Concepción footballers
North American Soccer League players
Ottawa Fury FC players
Chilean expatriate sportspeople in the United States 
Expatriate soccer players in the United States
Chilean expatriate sportspeople in Canada
Expatriate soccer players in Canada
Association football defenders
Chilean expatriates in Canada